Nils Olof Thorbjörn Fälldin (24 April 1926 – 23 July 2016) was a Swedish politician. He was Prime Minister of Sweden in three non-consecutive cabinets from 1976 to 1982, and leader of the Swedish Centre Party from 1971 to 1985. On his first appointment in 1976, he was the first non-Social Democrat Prime Minister for 40 years and the first since the 1930s not to have worked as a professional politician since his teens. He was also the last Prime Minister to not be from the Social Democrats or Moderate Party.

Early life
Fälldin was born in Högsjö parish, Ångermanland, the son of the farmer Nils Johan Fälldin and his wife Hulda (née Olsson). He grew up in a farming family in Ångermanland, and, in 1956, he and his wife, as a newlywed young couple, took over a small farm. However, the farming authorities did not approve the purchase, as the farm was considered too small and too run down for production, and so refused to provide farm subsidies. This fight led him into the youth branch of the Swedish agrarian party Farmers' League (Bondeförbundet), which in 1958 changed its name to the Centre Party. He and his family maintained their farm throughout his political life, and when he resigned from politics in 1985, he immediately returned to it.

Political career
Fälldin entered the Swedish national political stage when he was elected to the Swedish Riksdag in 1958 for the agrarian-rooted Centre Party. In competition with Johannes Antonsson, he became first vice-chairman of the party in 1969, and then chairman in 1971, succeeding veteran Gunnar Hedlund. In 1973, Fälldin proposed that the party should merge with the Liberal Party, but he failed to gain the support of a majority of party members.

In the 1976 election, the Social Democrats sensationally lost their majority for the first time in 40 years. The non-Socialist parties (the Centre Party, the Liberal Party and the Conservative Moderate Party) formed a coalition government, and, as the Centre Party was the largest of the three, Fälldin was appointed Prime Minister. Two years later, however, the coalition fell apart over the issue of Swedish dependency on nuclear power (with the Centre Party taking a strong anti-nuclear stand), which led to Fälldin's resignation and the formation of a minority Liberal Party government. In 1978, Fälldin sued Aftonbladet for 1 krona after they published a satirical interview with him from a mental hospital in which they claimed he had schizophrenia. Fälldin claimed that this was illegal, but later lost the case.

Following the 1979 election, Fälldin regained the post of Prime Minister, despite his party suffering major losses and losing its leading role in the centre-right camp, primarily due to public disenchantment with the Centre Party over its compromise on nuclear power with the nuclear-friendly Moderates, and he again formed a coalition government with the Liberals and the Moderates. This cabinet also lasted for two years, when disagreement over tax policies compelled the Moderates to leave the coalition. Fälldin continued as Prime Minister until the election in 1982, when the Social Democrats regained power as the Socialist bloc won a majority in the Riksdag.

After a disastrous second election defeat in 1985, Fälldin faced massive criticism from his party. He resigned as party leader and retired from politics. His posts since that time included chairman of Föreningsbanken, Foreningen Norden, and Televerket.

Membership
Fälldin was one of the board members of the Knut and Alice Wallenberg Foundation in the 1970s.

Personal life
In 1956, he married Solveig Öberg (born 1935), daughter of the farmer Albert Öberg and Sofia (née Näsman). He died at the age of 90, on 23 July 2016. The funeral was held on 11 August 2016 in Härnösand Cathedral, and he was buried at Högsjö Cemetery in Högsjö, Härnösand Municipality.

Legacy
During his 27 years as a national politician, Fälldin was generally appreciated in most political camps for his straightforwardness, unpretentiousness, and willingness to listen to all views. His two periods as Prime Minister were far from easy; trying to get three very different parties to work together in a coalition, while Sweden underwent its worst recession since the 1930s.

Fälldin refused to allow security concerns to rule his life.  During his years as Prime Minister, he lived on his own in a small rented apartment in central Stockholm, while his family ran the farm up in northern Sweden.  He did his own cooking and carried out refuse in the morning to the communal dustbins in the backyard, before taking a brisk 15-minute walk to his office, shadowed at a distance by an unmarked police car which had been waiting outside the apartment block; his only concession to the security concerns.

While serving as Prime Minister during the U 137 crisis in October–November 1981, Fälldin is remembered for the simple answer "Hold the border!" (Håll gränsen!) to the request for instructions from the Supreme Commander of the Swedish Armed Forces when faced with a suspected Soviet raid to free the stranded submarine.

Cabinets
Fälldin I Cabinet
Fälldin II Cabinet
Fälldin III Cabinet

References

Further reading

External links

|-

1926 births
2016 deaths
Members of the Riksdag from the Centre Party (Sweden)
Leaders of political parties in Sweden
People from Härnösand Municipality
Prime Ministers of Sweden
Swedish farmers
Members of the Andra kammaren